Charnock Richard Football Club is a football club based in Charnock Richard, near Chorley, Lancashire, England.

History
The club was originally established in 1933 when a team from the village of Charnock Richard joined the Chorley Alliance League, a Sunday league competition. However, after winning the league in 1947–48, the club folded after attempting to run two teams during the following season. The club was reformed in 1955 and rejoined the Chorley Alliance League, winning the title in 1956–57, before switching to the Preston & District League. They won the league in 1960–61 and went on to win three successive league titles between 1966–67 and 1968–69. They won their final Preston & District League title in 1989–90, and also spent some time in the Bolton Combination.

In 1993 the club moved up to Division Two of the West Lancashire League. They were runners-up in 1994–95, earning promotion to Division One. After finishing as Division One runners-up in 1996–97, they won the division in 1997–98. The division was renamed the Premier Division in 1998, and they were runners-up again in 1998–99 and 2001–02, before winning the title in 2002–03. After finishing as runners-up in 2005–06, the club won the division again in 2008–09, and went on to win four consecutive titles between 2011–12 and 2014–15. A second-place finish in 2015–16 saw the club promoted to Division One of the North West Counties League. In their first season in Division One they were runners-up, earning promotion to the Premier Division.

Ground
The club started playing at Mossie Close in 1968, later moving to Mossie Park on the other side of the road. The ground has a 100-seat stand.

Club officials
Chairman: Shaun Tootell
Vice-chairman: Geoff Haslam
Club Secretary: Dave Rowland
Assistant Secretary: Graham Randle 
Committee Members: Steve Porter, Alan Baron, Ian Livesey, David Smith, Steven Taylor, Barry Mayren
Treasurer: Steve Mawdesley
First Team Manager: Ryan Donnellan
First Team Assistant Manager: David Haslam
First Team Coach: Danny Nolan
First Team Analyst: Lewis Spensley
Club Physio: Kate Smith
Groundsman: Vacant
Kit Manager: Craig Worthington
Reserve Manager: Steve Hart
Reserve Assistant Manager: Paul Charnley
Reserve Team Coach: Paul Billington
Club Photographer: Steven Taylor
Programme Co-ordinator: Ian Livesey
Media team: Adam Donnellan & Ian Livesey
Commercial Manager: Josh Vosper
Hospitality Manager: Jimmy Bibby

Honours
West Lancashire League
Premier Division champions 2002–03, 2008–09, 2011–12, 2012–13, 2013–14, 2014–15
Division One champions 1997–98
Richardson Cup winners 2001–02, 2003–04, 2013–14, 2014–15, 2015–16
Preston & District League
Premier Division champions 1960–61, 1966–67, 1967–68, 1968–69, 1989–90
Guildhall Cup winners 1957–58, 1963–64, 1968–69, 1992–93
Chorley Alliance League
Champions 1947–48, 1956–57
Lancashire Amateur Shield
Winners 1967–68, 2001–02, 2006–07, 2010–11, 2011–12
Goldline Trophy
Winners 2000–01, 2005–06
NWCFL Macron League Cup
Winners 2021-22

Records
Best FA Cup performance: Preliminary round, 2018–19
Best FA Vase performance: Second round, 2016–17
Record attendance: 641 vs Macclesfield FC, North West Counties League Premier Division, 22 January 2022

See also
Charnock Richard F.C. players

References

External links
Official website

Football clubs in England
Football clubs in Lancashire
Association football clubs established in 1933
1933 establishments in England
West Lancashire Football League
North West Counties Football League clubs